Daniel Desnoyers (born 27 February 1957) is a Canadian archer. He competed in the men's individual and team events at the 1988 Summer Olympics.

References

1957 births
Living people
Canadian male archers
Olympic archers of Canada
Archers at the 1988 Summer Olympics
Sportspeople from Quebec City
Pan American Games medalists in archery
Pan American Games silver medalists for Canada
Pan American Games bronze medalists for Canada
Archers at the 1979 Pan American Games
Archers at the 1983 Pan American Games
Medalists at the 1983 Pan American Games
20th-century Canadian people
21st-century Canadian people